Rabbi Pesach Raymon Yeshiva is a co-educational Orthodox Jewish day school in Edison, in Middlesex County, New Jersey, United States, that serves students in pre-Kindergarten through eighth grade. Rabbi Pesach Raymon Yeshiva has been accredited by the Middle States Association of Colleges and Schools Commission on Secondary Schools since 2001.

As of the 2017–18 school year, the school had an enrollment of 229 students (plus 53 in PreK) and 24.1 classroom teachers (on an FTE basis), for a student–teacher ratio of 9.5:1. The school's student body was 99.1% (227) White and 0.9% (2) Hispanic.

Awards and recognition
In September 2013, the yeshiva was one of 15 schools in New Jersey to be recognized by the United States Department of Education as part of the National Blue Ribbon Schools Program, an award called the "most prestigious honor in the United States' education system" and which Education Secretary Arne Duncan described as honoring schools that "represent examples of educational excellence".

References

External links
 
 School Data for Rabbi Pesach Raymon Yeshiva, National Center for Education Statistics

Edison, New Jersey
Jewish day schools in New Jersey
Middle schools in New Jersey
Middle States Commission on Secondary Schools
Modern Orthodox Jewish day schools in the United States
Modern Orthodox Judaism in New Jersey
Private elementary schools in New Jersey
Private middle schools in New Jersey
Schools in Bergen County, New Jersey
Orthodox yeshivas in New Jersey